The River Heddon is a river in Devon, in the south of England. Running along the western edges of Exmoor, the river reaches the North Devon coast at Heddon's Mouth.

The Heddon Valley is renowned for its natural environment, with bridges and stepping stones along the river, meadows, and walks which start from the National Trust shop and information centre which has been in the ownership of the National Trust since 1963.

There are remains of a lime kiln on its western edge. The remains of a Roman fortlet are visible on the hilltop to the east of Heddon's Mouth.

The Lynton & Barnstaple Railway once ran through part of the valley, halting at the small village of Parracombe.

See also
Rivers of the United Kingdom

References

External links

Walks (easy), (hard) in the Heddon Valley
Heddon Valley information at the National Trust

Exmoor
Heddon, River
National Trust properties in Devon
Tourist attractions in Devon